Myobiidae is a family of mites, containing the following genera:

Acanthophthirius Perkins, 1925
Acrobatobia Fain & Lukoschus, 1976
Amorphacarus Ewing, 1938
Anuncomyobia Fain, 1972
Australomyobia Fain, 1973
Binunculoides Fain, 1972
Binuncus Radford, 1954
Blarinobia Jameson, 1955
Chimarrogalobia K. Uchikawa, 1986
Crocidurobia Jameson, 1970
Cryptomyobia Radford, 1954
Eadiea Jameson, 1949
Eudusbabekia E. W. Jameson, 1971
Eutalpacarus Jameson, 1949
Ewingana Radford, 1952
Foliomyobia Radford, 1948
Furipterobia K. Uchikawa, 1988
Gundimyobia Fain & Lukoschus, 1976
Gymnomyobia Fain & Lukoschus, 1976
Hipposiderobia Dusbábek, 1968
Idiurobia Fain, 1973
Ioannela Dusbábek & Lukoschus, 1973
Limnogalobia Fain & Lukoschus, 1976
Madamyobia Fain & Lukoschus, 1975
Metabinuncus Fain, 1972
Microgalobia Fain, 1972
Myobia von Heyden, 1826
Mystacobia Fain, 1972
Myzopodobia K. Uchikawa, 1988k
Natalimyobia K. Uchikawa, 1988
Nectogalobia A. Fain & Lukoschus, 1976
Neomyobia Radford, 1948
Nycterimyobia Fain, 1972
Oryzorictobia Fain & Lukoschus, 1976
Phyllostomyobia Fain, 1973
Placomyobia Jameson, 1970
Proradfordia Lukoschus, Dusbábek & Jameson, 1973
†Protohylomysobia Sidorchuk & Bochkov in Sidorchuk et al., 2018
Protomyobia Ewing, 1938
Pteracarus Jameson & Chow, 1952
Pteropimyobia Fain, 1973
Radfordia Ewing, 1938
Schizomyobia Fain, 1972
Thyromyobia Fain, 1976
Ugandobia Dusbábek, 1968
Xenomyobia Fain & Lukoschus, 1977

References

Trombidiformes
Acari families